Yıldırım Bosna SK is a football club from Bayrampaşa neighborhood of İstanbul. Club was founded by the migrant Turkish citizens who migrated from Balkans to İstanbul. Its first name was Altınçam. Then took several names like Sönmez Gençler and Yıldırım Genç Spor. But it was closed due to its connections with the minorities, after the Military Regime took the control at 1980. It was reestablished with the merge of Bosna SK and Yıldırım İdman Yurdu. Refounded club, played third level football between 2001 and 2006. They competed in the fourth tier TFF Third League 1st group for the 2008 – 2009 season.

Football clubs in Turkey
1945 establishments in Turkey
Bayrampaşa
Association football clubs established in 1945